Oldenzijl is a small village in Het Hogeland municipality in the Dutch province of Groningen. It had a population of around 45 in January 2017.

History
It was part of Uithuizermeeden municipality before 1979, when it became part of Hefshuizen.

Gallery

References

External links 

Het Hogeland
Populated places in Groningen (province)